Thomas Metzger (born 1933) is an academic at Stanford University.

Thomas or Tom Metzger may also refer to:

 Thomas Metzger (equestrian) (born 1959), Austrian equestrian
 Tom Metzger (born 1938), American white supremacist
 Tom Metzger, bass of the Realtime barbershop quartet